Giovanni Edson "Eddie" Edward (born September 20, 1988) is a former Canadian soccer player.

Career

Youth and college
Edward's amateur and collegiate soccer career allowed him to travel across North America. After graduating from the Ottawa Fury's Youth program, Edward began his collegiate duties at the NAIA's Graceland University. In his four years at Graceland, he helped the Jackets to an overall 58–16–8 record while scoring 15 goals and adding 13 assists. In 2006, Edward was part of Graceland's NAIA National Championship-winning squad, while in 2007, he helped the team become Region V and Conference Champions. Edward has also twice been named to the NAIA's Heart of America Athletic All-Conference team, in 2007 and 2008.

The Ottawa native is no stranger to the PDL, having traversed the amateur soccer ranks over the past three years with Ottawa Fury (2007, 2009) as well as with the Des Moines Menace in 2008 and Kansas City Brass in 2009. Edward has also featured for the Kansas City Wizards U19 squad where he led the team in goals helping them reach their first National finals appearance. Edward's ascention to the MLS professional ranks represents only the second-ever Fury player to achieve the feat after Tyler Hemming played for Toronto FC in 2007-2008.

FC Dallas
Edward signed for Major League Soccer club FC Dallas on March 25, 2010 after training with them during the pre-season. He made his professional debut in a US Open Cup qualifying match, but he had to wait until September 25 for his first MLS appearance, which came against Kansas City Wizards. Edward was waived by FC Dallas on November 23, 2011.

Puerto Rico Islanders
Edward signed with NASL club Puerto Rico Islanders on April 5, 2012.

FC Edmonton
After one season with the Islanders, Edward signed with Canadian NASL side FC Edmonton on December 4, 2012.

Ottawa Fury
In June 2016 Edward was released by FC Edmonton and signed with to his hometown club, Ottawa Fury FC, citing a need to be close to family. Edward was one of three Ottawa area players to sign with the Fury, the others being Maxim Tissot and Jamar Dixon. In November 2016, the Fury announced that they had re-signed Edward, and that he would stay with the club as it moved to the United Soccer League for the 2017 season. Edward trained with high performance coach Neil Miron at FTA Complex prior to 2018 season. In November 2017, the Fury announced Edward would remain with the club for the 2018 season.

Career statistics

Club

References

External links
 

1988 births
Living people
Canadian soccer players
Canadian expatriate soccer players
Des Moines Menace players
Expatriate soccer players in the United States
Expatriate footballers in Puerto Rico
FC Dallas players
FC Edmonton players
Graceland University alumni
Kansas City Brass players
Major League Soccer players
North American Soccer League players
Ottawa Fury (2005–2013) players
Ottawa Fury FC players
USL League Two players
Puerto Rico Islanders players
Soccer players from Ottawa
USL Championship players
Association football defenders
Canadian expatriate sportspeople in the United States
Canadian expatriate sportspeople in Puerto Rico